{|

{{Infobox ship career
|Hide header=
|Ship name=Daisy
|Ship owner= 
|Ship operator=
|Ship registry=
|Ship route=Puget Sound, Skagit River
|Ship ordered=
|Ship builder=
|Ship original cost=
|Ship yard number=
|Ship way number=
|Ship laid down=
|Ship launched=
|Ship completed=
|Ship christened=
|Ship acquired=
|Ship maiden voyage=
|Ship in service= 1880
|Ship out of service=1897 
|Ship identification=U.S. Registry #157006
|Ship fate=Sank near Edmonds, WA<ref name = McCurdy>McCurdy Marine History, at 23.</ref>
|Ship notes=
}}

|}Daisy was a sternwheel steamboat that ran on Puget Sound and the Skagit River from 1880 to 1897.

 CareerDaisy was built at Seattle for the Washington Steamboat Company in 1880.  The vessel was placed in service for the Skagit River trade.  In 1897 Daisy sank near Edmonds, Washington, or on 12 October burned near Clinton, Washington.

Notes

 References 
 Affleck, Edward L., A Century of Paddlewheelers in the Pacific Northwest, the Yukon, and Alaska, Alexander Nicolls Press, Vancouver, BC 2000 
 Newell, Gordon R., ed., H.W. McCurdy Marine History of the Pacific Northwest'',  Superior Publishing Co., Seattle, WA (1966)

1880 ships
Steamboats of Washington (state)